Sir Dennis Weatherstone KBE (29 November 1930 – 13 June 2008) was the former CEO and Chairman of J. P. Morgan & Co. Born in London, he attended North Western Polytechnic. In 1946, at age 16, he was hired as a bookkeeper and was quickly promoted to the foreign exchange trading desk at the Guarantee Trust Company, a predecessor firm in London. 
Weatherstone rose through the ranks, becoming Morgan's Chairman and CEO in 1991. He retired from J. P. Morgan in 1995 and was succeeded by Douglas "Sandy" Warner III.

Sir Dennis became a Vice Chairman and director in 1979, Chairman of the Executive Committee a year later and President in 1987. In 1990, he was named Chairman and Chief Executive Officer and was knighted by Queen Elizabeth II—the first J.P. Morgan employee to receive the honour.

Later that year, Sir Dennis helped the firm earn Federal Reserve authority to trade and sell corporate stocks, making J. P. Morgan the first bank-related securities firm with a full range of securities powers. A decade later, the Glass–Steagall Act was repealed, allowing banking companies to provide any service, whether it be a loan, advice or a securities offering.

JPMorgan invented value-at-risk (VaR) as a tool for measuring exposure to trading losses. The tool emerged in the wake of the 1987 stock market crash when Sir Dennis asked his division chiefs to put together a briefing to answer the question: "How much can we lose on our trading portfolio by tomorrow's close?"

Sir Dennis served as an independent member of the Board of Banking Supervision of the Bank of England from 1995 through 2001.
He was also a board member of Merck & Co., General Motors and the NYSE, and a director of Air Liquide.

References
 J.P. Morgan & Co. Shareholder Report (1994 and 1995)
 "Dennis Weatherstone, Banking Sage, Dies at 77". The New York Times, June 18, 2008.
 Remembering Dennis Weatherstone
 Bloomberg Financial Database

1930 births
2008 deaths
English bankers
Knights Commander of the Order of the British Empire
People from Marylebone
20th-century English businesspeople
JPMorgan Chase people